The Baku 2012–13 season is Baku's fifteenth Azerbaijan Premier League season. This is Baku's first season under Božidar Bandović, who replaced Novruz Azimov after the UEFA Europa League qualifiers where they were beaten 2–0 on aggregate by Mura 05 of Slovenia. Baku will also participate in the 2012–13 Azerbaijan Cup.

Squad
On Loan

Transfers
Summer

In:

http://fcbaku.com/content.php?lang=en&page=2&sid=&nid=1699&n=7

http://fcbaku.com/content.php?lang=en&page=2&sid=&nid=1719&n=6

Out:

Winter

In:

Out:

Competitions
Friendlies

Azerbaijan Premier League

Results summary

Results by round

Results

League table

Azerbaijan Premier League Championship Group
Results summary

Results by round

Results

Table

Azerbaijan Cup

UEFA Europa League
First qualifying round

Notes
Note 1: Baku's game against Neftchi Baku was postponed due to Neftchi's involvement in the 2012–13 UEFA Champions League
Note 2: Baku's game against Khazar Lankaran was postponed due to a clash with FIFA U-17 Women's World Cup qualifier.
Note 3: Baku's game away to Turan Tovuz on 10 December was postponed due to a fire at the Tofig Bakhramov Stadium.
Note 4: Baku played their home match at Dalga Arena, Baku instead of their regular stadium, Tofiq Bahramov Stadium, Baku.

Squad statistics

Appearances and goals

|-
|colspan="14"|Players who appeared for Baku no longer at the club:''

|}

Goal scorers

Disciplinary record

References

External links 
 FK Baku at Soccerway.com

FC Baku seasons
Baku